Amphimedon compressa,  the erect rope sponge, red tree sponge, red tubular sponge, or red sponge is a demosponge found in southern Florida, the Caribbean Sea, and the Bahamas. It can be deep red, orange, brown, or black.

Taxonomy
The erect rope sponge used to be classified as Haliclona rubens, but this was determined to be a synonym of Haliclona compressa. This name, however, is no longer accepted, and the World Porifera Database lists this species as Amphimedon compressa – Duchassaing & Michelotti, 1864.

Description
The tree-like curved branches grow from a basal encrusting mass, but very occasionally this sponge grows as a small, unbranched, flattened hemisphere. Many small osculi are found on the branches. It is usually a dull dark red, but the colour varies and it is sometimes black, dark brown, greyish-brown, bright red, or orange. In dark positions under overhangs, it grows in mats and its colour is weak.

Distribution
The erect rope sponge grows as part of the coral reef community. It occurs on the crests and sides of the reef growing on rock, and on vertical surfaces, it protrudes sideways.

Biology
The erect rope sponge feeds on plankton and tiny organic particles suspended in the water. To do this, the sponge draws in water through small pores called ostia, filters out particles in the choanocyte tissue, then moves the water through the spongocoel or central cavity before pumping the water out through the osculi.

Ecology
It often has the sponge brittle star (Ophiothrix suensoni) living on its surface. Sponges are often eaten by sea stars, but the red tree sponge contains certain secondary metabolites which deter feeding by the common Caribbean starfish Echinaster echinophorus.

References

Chalinidae
Fauna of the Atlantic Ocean
Sponges described in 1864